Harold Fox may refer to:

 Harold Fox (rugby league), rugby league footballer who played in the 1940s and 1950s
 Harold Fox (basketball) (born 1949), basketball player
 Harold G. Fox (1896–1970), Canadian lawyer, scholar, and businessman
 Harold Munro Fox (1889–1967), British zoologist